Baka (Tara Baka) is a Central Sudanic language of South Sudan, with the majority living in an area centered on Maridi, South Sudan, but also a couple thousand speakers in the DRC.

A 2013 survey reported that the Baka were the largest ethnic group in Maridi County, South Sudan. They also live in Baka Boma, Tore Payam, Yei County, South Sudan.

Phonology

Consonants

Vowels 

Neutral vowel: ɨ

References

Languages of South Sudan
Bongo–Bagirmi languages